Dubai Canal is an artificial water canal unveiled on 2 October 2013 and inaugurated on 9 November 2016. The canal side-walk comprises one shopping centre, four hotels, 450 restaurants, luxury housing, walkways and cycle paths. The development was designed by AE7 Architects and Planners.

Built by BESIX Group subsidiary Six Construct, the canal is crossed by 3 pedestrian/bicycle bridges, including the Dubai Water Canal Bridge, better known as the Twisted Bridge and now renamed Bridge of Tolerance, so named by His Highness Shaikh Mohammad Bin Rashid Al Maktoum, Vice-President and Prime Minister of the UAE and Ruler of Dubai on November 15, 2017.

Infrastructure

Roads and Transport Authority (RTA) built bridges over the canal for Sheikh Zayed Road, Al Wasl Road and Jumeirah Road. The Sheikh Zayed road bridge has eight lanes in each direction and three lanes in each direction on Al Wasl Road and Jumeirah Road. The crossings are 8.5 meters above the water to allow boats to pass underneath.

The project also includes three pedestrian crossings in addition to footpaths on all three new bridges and four marina stations for public transport.

As of July 2014, the earthworks for the project near Sheikh Zayed Road had commenced.

It was unveiled on 2 October 2013 and inaugurated on 9 November 2016. The canal and its bridges were built between 2014 and 2016 by BESIX subsidiary Six Construct.

One of the first projects launched on Dubai Water Canal is Marasi Business Bay, which broke ground in June 2017.

References

2016 establishments in the United Arab Emirates
Canals in the United Arab Emirates
Geography of Dubai